Religious drama may refer to:

Natya - the sacred Hindu temple drama
Liturgical drama - Christian drama